Liam O'Brien (born July 29, 1994) is a Canadian professional ice hockey forward. He is currently playing with the  Arizona Coyotes of the National Hockey League (NHL). O'Brien is mostly known as an enforcer.

Playing career
O'Brien was drafted in the first round, 10th overall, by the Rimouski Oceanic in QMJHL 2010 Draft. He scored his first  
QMJHL goal in his second game against the Lewiston Maineiacs. He played for the Oceanic until 2011 when he was traded to the Rouyn-Noranda Huskies for draft picks.

Passed over in the NHL Entry Draft, O'Brien received a training camp invite from the Washington Capitals in 2014, and made the team, earning himself a three-year entry level contract on October 6, 2014. He made his NHL debut on October 9, 2014 in a game against the Montreal Canadiens, in which he registered his first NHL fight against the Canadiens' Brandon Prust.

On June 10, 2019, O'Brien agreed to return for his sixth season within the Capitals organization, agreeing to a one-year, two-way contract extension. O'Brien was waived by the Washington Capitals on September 30, 2019 and loaned to the Hershey Bears the following day.

At the completion of his sixth-year with the Bears, O'Brien left the Capitals organization as a free agent. With the COVID-19 pandemic delaying the following North American season, O'Brien was belatedly signed to an AHL contract with the Colorado Eagles, primary affiliate to the Colorado Avalanche, on November 27, 2020. In the 2020-21 season, O'Brien immediately contributed with the Eagles, adding 8 points through 12 games, before signing a one-year NHL contract with the Avalanche for the remainder of the campaign on March 30, 2021. 

He made his debut for the Avalanche, appearing in his first NHL contest in over three years, in a 4-2 victory over the St. Louis Blues on April 2, 2021. He recorded his first multi-point game with a career high 2 assists in a 4-3 victory over the Blues on April 14, 2021. Adding physicality in a fourth-line role for Colorado, O'Brien finished with 3 assists and 40 penalty minutes through 12 regular season games.

As a free agent, O'Brien was signed to a one-year, two-way contract with the Arizona Coyotes on July 28, 2021.

International play
As a 16 year old, O'Brien was selected to compete at the 2011 World U-17 Hockey Challenge.

Career statistics

Regular season and playoffs

International

References

External links

1994 births
Living people
Arizona Coyotes players
Canadian ice hockey centres
Colorado Avalanche players
Colorado Eagles players
Hershey Bears players
Ice hockey people from Nova Scotia
Rimouski Océanic players
Rouyn-Noranda Huskies players
Sportspeople from Halifax, Nova Scotia
Undrafted National Hockey League players
Washington Capitals players